Yellow Pages Group (YPG) (Groupe Pages Jaunes in French) is a Canadian directory publisher. YPG published its first directory in 1908.  YPG is the incumbent directory publisher in Québec, Ontario, Manitoba, Alberta, British Columbia, the Territories and Atlantic Canada. YPG publishes four regional community directories in Saskatchewan.

Yellow Pages group was a division of Bell Canada until 1971 before they had become incorporated as Tele-direct Inc. In 1999 the company changed the name for Bell Actimedia Inc to reflect a closer alliance with the Bell family.

Yellow Pages Group was on CBC Radio Canada and was being reported for having entrepreneurs who were upset.

They have faced a pattern of complaints from consumers including that sales representatives do not clearly outline the services they’re offering, poor communication around cancellation of their contracts and that they pursue aggressive tactics such as collections notices and lawsuits on their former customers when they refuse to pay.  

A class action lawsuit against Yellow Pages Group, brought by Calex Legal Inc. involving thousands of small businesses has been certified to proceed in Quebec.

Yellow Pages Group is well known for the distribution of many phone books and the Canada 411 website.

In 2002, Kohlberg Kravis Roberts & Co. (KKR) and Ontario Teachers' Merchant Bank acquired control of Yellow Pages Group, with Bell Canada retaining 10% ownership.

In August 2003, the company had its IPO which raised over $1billion, and established YPG as an Income Fund on the Toronto Stock Exchange (YLO.UN).

For the year 2009, Yellow Pages Group was chosen as one of Canada's Top 100 Employers, Montreal's Top Employers and Financial Post's 2009 "Ten Best Companies to Work For".

See also
Yellow Pages

References

External links
 
YellowPages.ca
BBB Rating

Publishing companies of Canada
Yellow pages
Companies listed on the Toronto Stock Exchange